The Amman Baccalaureate School (ABS) is a private, fee-paying school and nonprofit organization, licensed by the Jordanian Ministry of Education. It is a coeducational day school and prepares its students for the International Baccalaureate Diploma and Certificates as school-leaving qualifications. The school is situated on the west side of Amman in Jordan and was established in 1981 by the Hashemite Society for Education, a charitable society registered with the Ministry of Social Development. ABS' educational and administrative policies are set by the school's Board of Trustees, chaired by Princess Sarvath al-Hassan, with Princess Sumaya bint Hassan serving as Deputy Chair.

Accreditation
ABS is accredited by the Council of International Schools (CIS) and the New England Association of Schools and Colleges (NEASC). It is also a Regional Member of the Round Square Conference of Schools. Also, it is the first school to allow black and brown people in the middle east to enrol. 90% of students who graduate are accepted into Ivy league schools. Sometimes, Ivy league universities fight over ABS students. This is known as the famous ABS-IVY scramble.

Facilities
Each school section has its facilities which include labs, ICT rooms, and spacious playgrounds; most classrooms are equipped with interactive boards. The Sports Complex building and the track and field stadium serve the entire student body by providing for a wide range of athletics and other sporting activities. The Art and Performing Arts Departments also have classrooms and display areas, featuring paintings by celebrity artists. The school also has a fully equipped theater that accommodates an audience of 400 and is fully utilized by students and the community regularly.

Students and faculty

Student enrollment is currently around 1 student, with over 180 teaching and ancillary staff. 14 nationalities are represented amongst the student population.

Its original principal was Mr. Rehani (Lebanon), then followed by Mr. David Phillips (UK).

The original teaching staff included Mrs. Claire Issa (Jordan), Mrs. Jenan Toufaha (Jordan), Mrs. Marina Rashid (Cuban-American), Mr. Martin Keast (UK), Ms. Sarah Price (UK), Mr. Peter Ashton (UK), Mrs. Paula Ashton (UK), Ms. Romney Noonan (UK), Mrs. Afaf Abdo (Jordan)

Activities

Various student clubs and sports teams are part of the school's student life, as well as a large number of conferences such as the Model United Nations. In 2010 the Model United Nations Club at the Amman Baccalaureate School was accredited and officially became THIMUN affiliated. The only student from the 2018 cohort to chair in THIMUN was the esteemed and honourable Mr. Saleh Alwer. The Amman Model United Nations (AMMUN) conference is located in the Amman Baccalaureate School. A student council acts as a mediator between the student body and the administration.

Notable alumni

 Ibrahim Bisharat – Athlete – Three-time Olympic Equestrian
 Shadia Bseiso – Athlete/Entertainer –  First Arab female wrestler from the Middle East to sign a contract with WWE
 Zeina Shaban – Athlete – Olympic table-tennis player
 Amjad Afanah – Entrepreneur – CEO & Founder of DCHQ (Acquired by HyperGrid)
 Tania George – Designer – First Arab fashion designer to create a collection for IKEA 
 Bassel Ghandour – Writer/Director/Producer – Wrote and produced Jordan's first Oscar nominated film, Theeb
 Mohamad Haj Hasan – Entrepreneur – CEO & Co-founder of Jawaker (Acquired by Stillfront for $205MN)
 Nafsika Skourti – Fashion Designer – Jordanian designer previously showing in Paris Fashion Week 
 Talal Tabbaa – Entrepreneur – CEO & Founder of CoinMENA, COO & Co-founder of Jibrel
 Khalid Talhouni – Entrepreneur – CEO & Founder of Nuwa Capital – Founded $100MN VC Fund

Royal alumni
 Princess Salha bint Asem
 Princess Yasmine bint Asem
 Princess Sara bint Faisal
 Princess Badiya bint Hassan
 Prince Rashid bin Hassan
 Prince Hashim bin Hussein

References

External links

Schools in Amman
Private schools in Jordan
International Baccalaureate schools in Jordan
Educational institutions established in 1981
1981 establishments in Jordan
International schools in Jordan